Rejepow (masculine) or Rejepowa (feminine) is a Turkmen surname. Notable people with the surname include:

 Akmyrat Rejepow, Turkmen general
 Guwanç Rejepow (born 1982), Turkmen footballer
 Maýsa Rejepowa (born 1993), Turkmen sprinter 
 Rejepbaý Rejepow (born 1992), Turkmen weightlifter

 Surnames
 Turkmen-language surnames